Kiss You may refer to:

 "Kiss You" (One Direction song), 2013
 "Kiss You" (iiO song), 2005
 Kiss You, 2002 EP and song by Naozumi Takahashi
 "Kiss You", 1959 song by Tony Bennett
 "Kiss You", 2000 song by Keith Sweat from Didn't See Me Coming
 "Kiss You", 2000 song by Tyrone Davis from Relaxin' with Tyrone
 "Kiss You", 2005 song by Exile from compilation Single Best
 "Kiss You (When It's Dangerous)", 1986 song by Eight Seconds

See also
 Kiss Me (disambiguation)
 Kiss (disambiguation)